Yustinus Harjosusanto M.S.F. (born 5 September 1953) is an Indonesian Roman Catholic archbishop.

Biography
On 6 January 1982 Harjosusanto was ordained a priest of the congregation of the Missionaries of the Holy Family. On 9 January 2002, Harjosusanto was nominated as the bishop of the recently formed Roman Catholic Diocese of Tanjung Selor, and on 14 April 2002 he was ordained bishop in Saint Mary's Church, Tarakan.

On 15 February 2015 Harjosusanto was chosen by Pope Francis to be archbishop of the Roman Catholic Archdiocese of Samarinda, succeeding the deceased Florentinus Sului Hajang Hau.

References 

1953 births
Living people
Javanese people
People from Magelang Regency
21st-century Roman Catholic archbishops in Indonesia